In mathematics, the modular lambda function λ(τ) is a highly symmetric holomorphic function on the complex upper half-plane.  It is invariant under the fractional linear action of the congruence group Γ(2), and generates the function field of the corresponding quotient, i.e., it is a Hauptmodul for the modular curve X(2).  Over any point τ, its value can be described as a cross ratio of the branch points of a ramified double cover of the projective line by the elliptic curve , where the map is defined as the quotient by the [−1] involution.

The q-expansion, where  is the nome, is given by:

 . 

By symmetrizing the lambda function under the canonical action of the symmetric group S3 on X(2), and then normalizing suitably, one obtains a function on the upper half-plane that is invariant under the full modular group , and it is in fact Klein's modular j-invariant.

Modular properties
The function  is invariant under the group generated by

The generators of the modular group act by

Relations to other functions
It is the square of the elliptic modulus, that is, .  In terms of the Dedekind eta function  and theta functions,

and,

where

we have

Since the three half-period values are distinct, this shows that  does not take the value 0 or 1.

The relation to the j-invariant is

which is the j-invariant of the elliptic curve of Legendre form 

Given , let

where  is the complete elliptic integral of the first kind with parameter .
Then

Modular equations

The quantity  (and hence ) can be thought of as a holomorphic function on the upper half-plane :

Lambda-star

Definition and computation of lambda-star

The function  (where ) gives the value of the elliptic modulus , for which the complete elliptic integral of the first kind  and its complementary counterpart  are related by following expression:

The values of  can be computed as follows:

Properties of lambda-star

Every  value of a positive rational number is a positive algebraic number:

The following expression is valid for all :

where  is the Jacobi elliptic function delta amplitudinis with modulus .

By knowing one  value, this formula can be used to compute related  values:

Further relations:

Lambda-star values of integer numbers of 4n-3-type:

Lambda-star values of integer numbers of 4n-2-type:

Lambda-star values of integer numbers of 4n-1-type:

Lambda-star values of integer numbers of 4n-type:

Lambda-star values of rational fractions:

Ramanujan's class invariants

 

where . For such , the class invariants are algebraic numbers. For example

Identities with the class invariants include

These are the relations between lambda-star and the class invariants:

Other appearances

Little Picard theorem
The lambda function is used in the original proof of the Little Picard theorem, that an entire non-constant function on the complex plane cannot omit more than one value.  This theorem was proved by Picard in 1879.   Suppose if possible that f is entire and does not take the values 0 and 1.  Since λ is holomorphic, it has a local holomorphic inverse ω defined away from 0,1,∞.  Consider the function z → ω(f(z)).  By the Monodromy theorem this is holomorphic and maps the complex plane C to the upper half plane.  From this it is easy to construct a holomorphic function from C to the unit disc, which by Liouville's theorem must be constant.

Moonshine
The function  is the normalized Hauptmodul for the group , and its q-expansion ,   where , is the graded character of any element in conjugacy class 4C of the monster group acting on the monster vertex algebra.

Footnotes

References

Notes

Other
 
  
 
 
 

 Borwein, J. M. and Borwein, P. B. Pi & the AGM: A Study in Analytic Number Theory and Computational Complexity. New York: Wiley, pp. 139 and 298, 1987.

 Conway, J. H. and Norton, S. P. "Monstrous Moonshine." Bull. London Math. Soc. 11, 308-339, 1979.

 Selberg, A. and Chowla, S. "On Epstein's Zeta-Function." J. reine angew. Math. 227, 86-110, 1967.

External links
 Modular lambda function at Fungrim

Modular forms
Elliptic functions